No Meio da Chuva Eu Grito "Help" (Portuguese for "In the Middle of the Rain I Shout Out for Help") is the debut solo studio album by Brazilian singer and former Titãs and Cabine C member Ciro Pessoa. It was released on August 1, 2003 by Voiceprint Records. Most of the album's songs were originally written by Pessoa during the 1980s and 1990s, such as "Dona Nenê", which he wrote for and was initially performed by Titãs, and "Papapa" and "Tudo que Me Faz Sentir Você", which he originally wrote while with his short-lived project Ciro Pessoa e Seu Pessoal (CPSP). "Até os Anos 70" is a tribute to French poet Serge Gainsbourg.

The album is available for free download on Ciro Pessoa's official SoundCloud page. In 2019, the album was re-issued digitally in all streaming media platforms by Curumim Records.

Track listing

Personnel
 Ciro Pessoa – vocals
 Kokinho – bass
 Flavinho – drums, percussion
 Apollo 9 – guitar, keyboards, production
 Helena – backing vocals in "Até os Anos 70"
 Beto Villares – backing vocals in "Até os Anos 70"
 Cláudio Elizabetsky – photography, cover art

References

External links
 Ciro Pessoa's SoundCloud profile

2003 debut albums
Ciro Pessoa albums
Voiceprint Records albums
Portuguese-language albums
Albums free for download by copyright owner